The Grand Orient of Portugal (Grande Oriente Lusitano) is a symbolic Masonic Obedience founded in 1802, thus being the oldest Portuguese Masonic Obedience. Its first Grand Master was Sebastião José de São Paio de Melo e Castro Lusignan, grandson  of the first Marquis of Pombal, and his symbolic name was Egas Moniz.

The Grand Orient of Portugal belongs to the Masonic liberal current, proclaiming the absolute liberty of conscience and adogmatism.

History
It was seen as a driving force in the anti-clericalism of the liberals. In 1921, it became a founding member of the International Masonic Association in alliance with the Grand Orient of France, Grand Orient of Belgium, Grand Lodge Alpina of Switzerland and the Grand Orient of Italy, amongst many others.

Opposing every form of oppression, the Grande Oriente Lusitano has faced throughout its history many moments of fierce persecution by the most conservative and reactionary wings of society. Amongst these moments, the prohibition during the Estado Novo dictatorship (law nº1901 dated May 13, 1935, proposed by José Cabral who had recently joined the single state-ruled party União Nacional, National Union, after leaving the Portuguese integralists and the national-syndicalists leadered by Francisco Rolão Preto) which forced Portuguese freemasons into clandestinity and often prison and political exile. 

Fernando Pessoa, the renowned Portuguese poet, who assumed himself as a profane (or non-mason) published an article in Diário de Lisboa (Lisbon Daily, a daily newspaper) defending Freemasonry and specifically the Grande Oriente Lusitano. During clandestinity (1935-1974), the Grande Oriente Lusitano had its buildings confiscated and the Masonic Palace, in center Lisbon, occupied by the Legião Portuguesa (Portuguese Legion, a para-military political force created for the "defense of the State").

The Revolution of the Carnations on April 25, 1974 revoked law nº1901 and the Grande Oriente Lusitano could once more see the light of day and have its buildings returned.

Rites
Under the auspices of the Grande Oriente Lusitano there are lodges of the Ancient and Accepted Scottish Rite and of the French Rite. These Rites are administered by the respective philosophical Potences with which the Grande Oriente Lusitano has a treaty to confer the symbolic degrees:
 Supreme Council of the Grand Inspector-General of the 33rd Degree of the Ancient and Accepted Scottish Rite for Portugal and its jurisdiction
 Sovereign Grand Chapter of the Cavaliers Rose-Croix - Grand Chapter General of the French Rite of Portugal

Grémio Lusitano
The three potencies are represented in civil society through the Grémio Lusitano, a cultural, recreational and philanthropic society whose headquarters are situated at the Rua do Grémio Lusitano, number 25, in Lisbon. This building, the Masonic Palace, also hosts the Portuguese Masonic Museum, considered by many as one of the best of its kind in Europe. The Museum is open to the general public.

Grand Masters
1804 – 1809 – Sebastião de Sampaio de Melo e Castro
1809 – 1816 – Fernando Romão da Costa Ataíde e Teive de Sousa Coutinho
1816 – 1817 – Gomes Freire de Andrade e Castro
1820 – 1821 – João Vicente Pimentel Maldonado (interim)
1821 – 1823 – João da Cunha Souto Maior
1823 – 1839 – José da Silva Carvalho
1839 – 1841 – Manuel Gonçalves de Miranda
1841 – 1841 – Bartolomeu dos Mártires Dias e Sousa (interim)
1841 – 1846 – António Bernardo da Costa Cabral
1846 – 1847 – João de Deus Antunes Pinto
1847 – 1849 – António Bernardo da Costa Cabral
1849 – 1853 – Marcelino Máximo de Azevedo e Melo
1854 – 1861 – José Joaquim de Almeida Moura Coutinho
1861 – 1863 – Frederico Leão Cabreira de Brito Alvelos Drago Valente;
1863 – 1867 – Caetano Gaspar de Almeida e Noronha Portugal Camões de Albuquerque Moniz e Sousa
1867 – 1869 – José da Silva Mendes Leal
1869 – 1881 – João Inácio Francisco de Paula de Noronha
1881 – 1884 – Miguel Baptista Maciel
1884 – 1886 – José Elias Garcia
1886 – 1887 – António Augusto de Aguiar
1887 – 1889 – José Elias Garcia
1889 – 1895 – Carlos Ramiro Coutinho
1895 – 1899 – Bernardino Machado Guimarães
1899 – 1906 – Luís Augusto Ferreira de Castro
1906 – 1907 – Francisco Gomes da Silva (interim)
1907 – 1928 – Sebastião de Magalhães Lima
1928 – 1929 – Luís Augusto Curson (interim)
1929 – 1929 – António José de Almeida
1929 – 1930 – Joaquim Maria de Oliveira Simões (interim)
1930 – 1935 – José Mendes Ribeiro Norton de Matos
1935 – 1937 – Maurício Armando Martins Costa (interim)
1937 – 1937 – Filipe Inês Ferreira (interim)
1937 – 1975 – Luís Gonçalves Rebordão
1975 – 1981 – Luís Hernâni Dias Amado
1982 – 1984 – Armando Adão e Silva
1984 – 1988 – José Eduardo Simões Coimbra
1988 – 1990 – Raul de Assunção Pimenta Rego
1990 – 1993 – Ramon de la Féria
1993 – 1996 – João Rosado Correia
1996 – 2002 – Eugénio de Oliveira
2002 – 2005 – António Duarte Arnaut
2005 – 2011 – António Fernando Marques Ribeiro Reis
2011 – present - Fernando Manuel Lima Valada Fernandes

See also
 CLIPSAS
 Afonso Costa

References

External links

 Grande Oriente Lusitano 

1802 establishments in Portugal
Co-Freemasonry
Freemasonry in Portugal